Duncan Graham Ross (26 May 1891 – 9 October 1982) was a Canadian merchant, soldier and Liberal politician born in Tottenham, Ontario.

He served as part of the 47th Battalion of the Canadian Expeditionary Force during World War I and commanded the Middlesex Light Infantry Regiment from 1926 to 1931.

He first ran for MP in Middlesex East in 1921, and was defeated, as he was in 1930. In 1935 he finally won the seat, and held it until 1945 when he was defeated by Harry Oliver White.

He died at a hospital in London in 1982.

References

External links
 

Liberal Party of Canada MPs
Members of the House of Commons of Canada from Ontario
Canadian Expeditionary Force officers
1891 births
1982 deaths